Digby may refer to:

Places

Australia 
 Digby, Victoria, a town

Canada 
 Digby (electoral district), a former federal electoral district in Nova Scotia (1867–1914)
 Digby (provincial electoral district), a provincial electoral district in Nova Scotia (1867–1993)
 Digby County, Nova Scotia, a county in the Canadian province of Nova Scotia
 Digby, Nova Scotia, a town
 Digby, Nova Scotia (municipal district), the eastern half of Digby County

England 
 Digby, Devon, a village in Exeter
 Digby and Sowton railway station, Exeter
 Digby, Lincolnshire, a village and civil parish in North Kesteven

United States 
 Digby, Ohio, an unincorporated community

People 
 Digby (name), a given name and surname
 Baron Digby, a title in the Peerage of Ireland
 Digby (blogger), pen name of Heather Digby Parton, writer of the liberal blog Hullabaloo

Military
 Douglas B-18 Bolo, a bomber used by United States Army Air Corps and Royal Canadian Air Force
 , a Royal Canadian Navy Second World War minesweeper
 RAF Digby, Lincolnshire, England, a former Royal Air Force station

Arts and entertainment 
 Digby (band), an American power pop band
 Digby (play), a 1985 play by Joseph Dougherty
 Digby Geste, one of three brothers in the novel Beau Geste and its various adaptations
 Digby O'Dell, "the friendly undertaker", a character in The Life of Riley comedy series
 Digby (Kento), a character in Animal Crossing
 The title character of the 1973 film Digby, the Biggest Dog in the World
 A dog on the television show Pushing Daisies
 A character in the 2012 cartoon TV show Littlest Pet Shop
 A cable ship in the Canadian children's television series Theodore Tugboat
 A character in Animal Crossing: New Leaf